Milli Jannides (born 1986 in Sydney) is an Australian-born New Zealand artist, living and based in London, United Kingdom.

Education
Jannides was born in Sydney, Australia, but moved to New Zealand and received her Bachelor of Fine Arts in Painting conjoint with a Bachelor of Arts in English Literature in 2009 from Elam School of Fine Arts in Auckland, while spending one semester in 2007 abroad on exchange at the Glasgow School of Art. In 2010 she was a guest student at the Düsseldorf Art Academy. In 2013 she received her Master of Arts in Painting from the Royal College of Art in London.

Career
In August 2013, Jannides exhibited work at the Hermes' lack of words exhibit at Artspace NZ in Auckland, together with Manon de Boer, Eleanor Cooper, William Hsu, and Rosalind Nashashibi. In her paintings she knots vision and memory together, with each work beginning with a quote or passage from literature and often connecting the physical landscape of the scene with the emotion of a character. She uses symbols like a tree, chains, an hourglass, and steps.

Work

Exhibitions
 Frottage Cottage, Hopkinson Mossman, Auckland, 2017
 The Company of Volcanoes, Hopkinson Mossman, Auckland, 2016
 Necessary Distraction: A Painting Show, Auckland Art Gallery Toi o Tāmaki, Auckland, 2015
 Sound Bow (with Ruth Buchanan), Johan Berggren, Malmö, 2014
 As the light dips, Hopkinson Mossman, Auckland, 2014
 Method & Gesture, Utopian Slumps, Melbourne, 2013
 Part Two Soft Eyes, TCB, Melbourne, 2013
 Hermes' lack of words, Artspace, Auckland, 2013
 Royal College of Art graduation show, London, 2013
 Eyelash Gnawing, Hopkinson Cundy, Auckland, 2012
 David Hofer and Milli Jannides, Hopkinson Cundy, Auckland, 2011
 Sue Crockford Gallery Window, Auckland, 2011
 Milli Jannides and Sam Rountree Williams, Victor and Hester, Glasgow, 2010
 Keeping Still, A Center for Art, Auckland, 2009
 Jokes with Strangers, A Center for Art, Auckland, 2008
 Paintings, Window Onsite, Auckland, 2008
 Here Today, Glasgow School of Art, Glasgow, 2007

References

External links
 Profile at Hopkinson Mossman
 Profile at Royal College of Art

Living people
1986 births
New Zealand women artists
New Zealand art
Elam Art School alumni
Alumni of the Royal College of Art
New Zealand artists